Daxing Hui Ethnic Township is an ethnic township for Hui people that is under the administration of Yanting County, Sichuan, China. , it has eight villages under its administration.

See also 
 List of township-level divisions of Sichuan

References 

Township-level divisions of Sichuan
Yanting County
Ethnic townships of the People's Republic of China
Hui people